The Journal of Investing is a quarterly peer-reviewed academic journal that covers research on investment management, asset allocation, performance measurement, benchmarking, mutual funds, investing strategies such as 130/30 funds, global allocation, and practical investment ideas and portfolio strategies for the institutional buy-side such as pension funds. It is published by Portfolio Management Research and the editor-in-chief is Brian R. Bruce (Hillcrest Asset Management).

Reception
The School of Management of Cranfield University ranked the journal C (on a scale of A to D) in an internal document recommending outlets for management and business research to their faculty. Similarly, a 2011 ranking of finance journals by Cranfield classed the journal 2 (on a scale of 1 to 4, with 4 being the highest).

Abstracting and indexing
The journal is abstracted and indexed in EBSCO databases, Emerging Sources Citation Index, ProQuest databases, and Scopus.

References

External links

Finance journals
Publications established in 1992
Quarterly journals
English-language journals